Robert Abbott or Abbot may refer to:

Robert Abbot (bishop) (1560–1617), Bishop of Salisbury
Robert Abbot (theologian) (1588?–1662?), English Puritan theologian
Robert Abbott, Baronet Hadfield (1858–1940), English metallurgist
Robert Abbott (bishop) (1869–1927), Bishop of Sherborne
Robert Abbott (New South Wales politician) (1830–1901), Irish-born politician in New South Wales
Robert Abbott (Michigan politician) (1770–1852), Michigan politician
Robert Sengstacke Abbott (1870–1940), African-American lawyer and publisher
Robert S. Abbott House, former home of Robert Sengstacke Abbot
R. Tucker Abbott (1919–1995), American conchologist and malacologist
Robert Abbott (game designer) (1933–2018), American game designer
Robert Abbott (director) (born 1964), American film director and TV producer
Robert Abbott (fl. 1930s–1960s), a founder of Abbott and Holder
Robert Abbot (politician), 15th-century English politician
Bob Abbott (1932–2010), Justice of the Kansas Supreme Court